Chikkamma is a 1969 Indian Kannada-language film, directed by R. Sampath and produced by M. Chandra Kumar and B. V. Anand. The film stars Rajkumar, Jayanthi, Balakrishna and Narasimharaju. The film had musical score by T. V. Raju. The film is a remake of 1966 movie Chitthi.

Cast

Rajkumar as Sundar
Jayanthi as Meenakshi
Balakrishna as "Gundlupete" Gundappa
Narasimharaju as Vishwa
Srinath as Balu, Meenakshi's brother
T. B. Nagappa
Hanumanthachar
Ganapathi Bhat
Bangalore Nagesh
T. R. Narayan
Mahadevappa
Master Srikrishna Kumar
Master Shekar
Master Srinivas
M. N. Lakshmidevi
Shanthamma
Sabitha
Mallika
Rathnamala
Jayalakshmi
Ranjanadevi
Baby Uma
Baby Raju
Vijayalalitha

Soundtrack

References

1960s Kannada-language films
Films scored by T. V. Raju